Ariano Mário Fernandes Fonsêca (João Pessoa, April 28, 1963) is a Brazilian lawyer and politician, affiliated to the Brazilian Democratic Movement (MDB).
He is great-nephew of the former governor of Paraíba José Fernandes de Lima. In his career was four times State Representative.

Ariano is also the founder of Radio Potiguara, the first radio in Mamanguape and member of the Paraíba State Federation of Industries (FIEP).

References

 http://www.paraiba.com.br/noticia.shtml?13684

1963 births
Brazilian Democratic Movement politicians
Brazilian Social Democracy Party politicians
Living people